The 1951–52 Scottish Division B was won by Clyde who, along with second placed Falkirk, were promoted to Division A. Arbroath finished bottom.

Table

References 

 Scottish Football Archive

Scottish Division Two seasons
2
Scot